It was a Dacian fortified town.

References

Dacian fortresses in Caraș-Severin County
Historic monuments in Caraș-Severin County